The Colorado Xplosion was the first women's professional basketball franchise in Colorado, an American Basketball League (ABL) team based in Denver.  Playing from 1996 through 1998, the team produced many memorable moments for Colorado sports fans and followers of women's professional basketball in general.

Team highlights include winning the Western Conference title in 1997, Edna Campbell  being voted on to the 1997 All-Star Team, Crystal Robinson being the inaugural ABL Rookie of the Year, Debbie Black being the league's first Defensive Player of the Year, and Sylvia Crawley winning the 1998 Slam Dunk Contest at the ABL All-Star Game with a blindfolded dunk.  Black made pro basketball history on December 8, 1996 when she became the first woman and only the second player ever to record a Quadruple Double, with 10 points, 14 rebounds, 12 assists and 10 steals against Atlanta.  Players for the Xplosion included  Edna Campbell, Crystal Robinson, Debbie Black, Sylvia Crawley, Nekeshia Henderson, Tari Phillips, and Vonda Ward.

After the franchise ceased operations with the abrupt demise of the ABL in the 1998–99 season, Xplosion players went on to continue their careers in the WNBA.

Team record

All-Star players 
 Edna Campbell (ABL All-Star 1997)
 Crystal Robinson (ABL 2nd Team 1997)
 Debbie Black (ABL 2nd Team 1997, ABL All-Star 1997–1998)

League honors 
All-Star
Edna Campbell (1997) 

Rookie of the Year
Crystal Robinson (1997)

Defensive Player of the Year
Debbie Black (1997)

References 

American Basketball League (1996–1998) teams
Defunct basketball teams in the United States
Basketball teams established in 1996
Sports clubs disestablished in 1998
Sports teams in Denver
Basketball teams in Colorado
1996 establishments in Colorado
1998 disestablishments in Colorado
Defunct sports teams in Colorado
Women's sports in Colorado
Basketball in Denver
ca:American Basketball League III